The Knightstown Historic District is national historic district located at Knightstown, Henry County, Indiana. It is roughly bounded by Morgan, Adams, Third, and McCullum Streets and encompasses 536 contributing buildings.  It developed between about the 1830s and 1936, and includes many excellent examples of Italianate, Greek Revival, and Gothic Revival styles of architecture.   Notable sites of interest include the Knightstown Academy, Elias Hinshaw House, the Knightstown Public Square.  Other notable buildings include the Friends Church (1874-1875), Bethel Presbyterian Church (1885), Christian Church (1882), IOOF Building (1897-1898), Masonic Hall (1900-1901), Lehmanowsky House (c. 1844–1850), Morgan Building (1866-1867), Old Town Hall (1892), Knightstown Public Library (1912), and U.S. Post Office (1936).

It was added to the National Register of Historic Places in 1986.

References

External links

 National Register of Historic Places for Henry County, Indiana http://www.nationalregisterofhistoricplaces.com/IN/Henry/state.html

National Register of Historic Places in Henry County, Indiana
Knightstown, Indiana
Greek Revival architecture in Indiana
Gothic Revival architecture in Indiana
Italianate architecture in Indiana
Historic districts in Henry County, Indiana
Historic districts on the National Register of Historic Places in Indiana